Babai is an urban-type settlement in Kharkiv Raion of Kharkiv Oblast in Ukraine. It is located on the right bank of the Udy in the drainage basin of the Don. Babai belongs to Vysokyi settlement hromada, one of the hromadas of Ukraine. Population:

Economy

Transportation
The closest railway stations are Pokotylivka and Karachivka, both in Pokotylivka, on the railway connecting Kharkiv and Synelnykove via Lozova and Pavlohrad.

The settlement has road access to Highway M18 connecting Kharkiv with Dnipro and Zaporizhzhia.

References

Urban-type settlements in Kharkiv Raion
Kharkovsky Uyezd